Sugar Blue (born James Joshua "Jimmie" Whiting, December 16, 1949, Harlem, New York City) is an American blues harmonica player. He is probably best known for playing on the Rolling Stones' single "Miss You", and in partnering Louisiana Red.

The Chicago Tribune said, "The sound of Sugar Blue's harmonica could pierce any night... it's the sound of a musician who transcends the supposed limitations of his instrument."

Biography
In the mid-1970s, Blue played as a session musician on Johnny Shines's Too Wet to Plow (1975) and with Roosevelt Sykes. While in the company of the latter, he met Louisiana Red, and the two toured and recorded in 1978.

Taking advice from Memphis Slim, in the late 1970s Blue traveled to Paris, France. According to Ronnie Wood, Blue was found by Mick Jagger busking on the city streets. This led to him playing on several of the tracks on The Rolling Stones' Some Girls and Emotional Rescue albums: "Some Girls", "Send It to Me", "Down in the Hole" and "Miss You".

Trombonist Mike Zwerin backed Blue on his solo debut album, Crossroads (1979). Following the release of his From Chicago to Paris (1982), Blue joined Willie Dixon's Chicago Blues All Stars. In 1984, Blue's track "Another Man Done Gone", appeared on the compilation album Blues Explosion. It won a Grammy in 1985 for Best Traditional Blues Album.

Blue appeared with Brownie McGhee in the film Angel Heart (1987).

Sugar Blue joined as a side musician recording with Willie Dixon on the Grammy Award winning album, Hidden Charms (1988).

His next album, Blue Blazes, was released in 1994 and it included his version of "Miss You". It was followed by In Your Eyes (1995) and Code Blue (2007).

He played on the album Down Too Long, by Southside Denny and the Skintones, in 1988. Sugar Blue's next album, Threshold, was released by Beeble Music on January 26, 2010.

Writing in the Chicago Tribune, music critic Howard Reich said, "There's no mistaking Sugar Blue incendiary virtuosity. The speed and ferocity of his playing are matched by its inventiveness, with Blue packing nearly every phrase with trills, glissandos, clusters and chords. At times, it sounds as if two harps were working at once... intense, melodically ornate, punctuated by growls and swooping pitches, it's the sound of a musician who transcends the limitations of his instrument."

Discography

Albums

Compilations and reissues

See also
List of harmonica blues musicians
List of Chicago blues musicians
List of contemporary blues musicians
List of harmonicists

References

External links
Official website
"Sugar Blue" in Gérard Herzhaft, Encyclopedia of the Blues, 2nd edition

1949 births
Living people
American blues singers
American blues harmonica players
Contemporary blues musicians
Grammy Award winners
Harmonica blues musicians
Musicians from New York City
Songwriters from New York (state)
People from Harlem